Panteha Abareshi (born 1999) is a Canadian-born American multidisciplinary artist and curator, primarily working within installation art, video art, and performance art. They are of Jamaican and Iranian descent, and their work is about chronic illness and disability. Abareshi is based in Los Angeles, California. Abareshi identifies with the pronouns they/them/theirs.

Biography  
Panteha Abareshi was born in 1999 in Montreal, Quebec, Canada; and raised in Tucson, Arizona. Abareshi's mother is Jamaican and their father is Iranian; they were primarily raised by their single father. Abareshi was born with the genetic blood disorder, Sickle cell zero beta thalassemia which causes chronic pain and more pain as they age. Their blood disorder was diagnosed at age two. Abareshi identifies with the pronouns they/them/theirs.

Abareshi attended the University of Southern California (USC) in the Roski School of Art and Design. At USC, Jennifer West has served as a mentor and teacher.

Abareshi uses the experience of chronic illness to examine concepts of medical violence, representation, materialness, and more. Abareshi's video work, For Medical Use Only (2019) has been influential for artist Carolyn Lazard.

In January 2020, Abareshi was on the cover of Bitch magazine (spring 2020, 86 issue). In Spring 2020, they published the art book, Panteha Abareshi: I Am Inside the Body (published by Sming Sming Books). Abareshi was awarded the 2021 VSA Emerging Artists Competition, by the Kennedy Center.

Exhibitions 
 2017 – The Body As Site Of, group exhibition, Lippitt House at Brown University, Providence, Rhode Island
 2020 – Art4Equality x Life, Liberty & The Pursuit of Happiness, group exhibition, Brooklyn, New York City, New York Abareshi's work was part of the 2020 Art4Equality x Life, Liberty & The Pursuit of Happiness, public art exhibition with a public billboard located at Park Ave and Emerson Place in Brooklyn. 
 2020 – Shape Open 2020: The Future is Loading (Part II), Shape Arts, London, England
2021 – Panteha Abareshi: Tender Calamities, solo exhibition, Los Angeles Municipal Art Gallery (LAMAG), Los Angeles, California Their first major solo exhibition, Panteha Abareshi: Tender Calamities was at the Los Angeles Municipal Art Gallery was in 2021, during the COVID-19 pandemic in the United States.

Filmography 

 Infanticide (2018), performance based video
 Not Better Yet (2019), Super 8 and VHS film
 For Medical Use Only (2019), 8 mm and hi8 film
 For Parts (2020), VHS video

See also 
 List of Iranian women artists

References

External links 
 
 Official website

1999 births
Living people
University of Southern California alumni
American women installation artists
American installation artists
American women video artists
American video artists
American women performance artists
American performance artists
American people of Iranian-African descent
American people of Jamaican descent
Canadian emigrants to the United States
Canadian people of Jamaican descent
Canadian people of Iranian descent
Artists from Los Angeles
Artists from Montreal
Artists from Tucson, Arizona
Queer artists
Non-binary artists
People with sickle-cell disease
Artists with disabilities
21st-century African-American women
21st-century African-American people
21st-century American artists
21st-century American women artists
American artists of Iranian descent